Ras-GRF1 is a guanine nucleotide exchange factor. Its function is to release guanosine diphosphate, GDP, from the signaling protein RAS, thus increasing the activity of RAS by allowing it to bind to guanosine triphosphate, GTP, returning it to its active state. In this way, Ras-GRF1 has a key role in regulating the RAS signaling pathway. Ras-GRF1 mediates the activation of RAS via Ca2+ bound calmodulin protein.

Function 
Ras-GRF1 knockout mice have been shown to have learning and memory deficits associated with dysregulation of this pathway.  Ras-GRF1 has also been shown to be upstream from IGF1, allowing it to control growth in mice.  Although it is sometimes known as CDC25, it should not be confused with Cdc25. Ras-GRF1 is a paternally expressed imprinted gene, meaning that only the paternal allele of the gene is translated into protein. Disruption of this epigenetic imprinting also produces learning and memory deficits in neonatal mice.

Ras-GRF1 has been shown to mediate long term potentiation (LTP), affecting memory and learning. A signaling pathway involving Ras-GRF1/p38 MAP/CP -AMPAR has been shown to affect LTP. Ras-GRF1 knockout mice, induced with high frequency stimulation to induce LTP (HFS-LTP), displayed the inability to retain memory and distinguish similar concepts. A Ras-GRF1/ERK pathway has also been found to affect the activity of LTP in medium spiny neuron (MSN) pathways. Ras-GRF1 knockout mice treated with HFS-LTP have exhibited the inability to induce LTP in direct MSN pathways. Ras-GRF1 signaling has been thought to be involved with L-DOPA-induced dyskinesia, a condition in which LTP and MSN homeostasis are disrupted.

Alongside its regulation of learning and memory, Ras-GRF1 has exhibited the ability to impact pancreatic β-cell proliferation. Ras-GRF1 knockout mice have expressed decreased pancreatic β-cell concentration and activity. Reduction of β-cell mass and area has correlated to a decrease in circulating insulin levels, exposing a Ras-GRF1 signaling pathway that regulates glucose metabolism.

References

External links